The Robert Merritt Awards, commonly known as The Merritt Awards, were started in 2002 and are administered by Theatre Nova Scotia. The Merritts honour excellence in theatre throughout the province of Nova Scotia. They are named for Robert Merritt, who was well known to the Halifax community both as a teacher of playwriting in the Theatre Department at Dalhousie University, and as the film critic for CBC's Information Morning.

Awards are given for Acting, Direction, Lighting, Set Design, Costume Design, Sound Design, Music, and Outstanding New Play by a Nova Scotian Playwright. Special awards are given for Technician, Stage Manager, Volunteerism, and Career Legacy.

List of Robert Merritt Award nominees and winners by year

2020
See references

2020 Outstanding Theatre Technician: Thomas Brookes, The Last Wife, Neptune Theatre

2020 Outstanding Stage Manager: Robin Munro, Frankenstein by Fire, Two Planks and a Passion Theatre

2020 Outstanding Volunteer: Alex Mills

2020 Theatre Nova Scotia Legacy Award: Joan Craig

2020 Theatre Nova Scotia Scholarship: Logan Robins and Ursula Calder

2020 Wes Daniels Design Award: Wesley Babcock with Matchstick Theatre

2020 Neptune Theatre Chrysalis Emerging Artist Award: Anna Shepard

2019
See references

2019 Outstanding Theatre Technician: Andrew Cull

2019 Outstanding Stage Manager: Jessica Lewis

2019 Outstanding Volunteer: Alex Mills

2019 Theatre Nova Scotia Legacy Award: Susan Stackhouse

2019 Theatre Nova Scotia Scholarship: Anna Shepard

2019 Wes Daniels Design Award: Festival Antigonish Summer Theatre with Elizabeth Perry

2019 Neptune Theatre Chrysalis Emerging Artist Award: Chelsea Dickie

2019 Outstanding Presentation: Mouthpiece (presented by 2b theatre company)

2018
See references

2018 Outstanding Theatre Technician: Sean Burke

2018 Outstanding Stage Manager: Louisa Adamson

2018 Outstanding Volunteer: Radovan Marinkovic & Brian McKenzie (Two Planks and a Passion Theatre) and Angela Butler (Theatre Arts Guild)

2018 Theatre Nova Scotia Legacy Award: Mary-Colin Chisholm

2018 Theatre Nova Scotia Scholarship: Stephanie MacDonald

2018 Wes Daniels Design Award: Villain's Theatre with Vicky Williams

2018 Neptune Theatre Chrysalis Emerging Artist Award: Laura Vingoe-Cram

2017
See references

2017 Outstanding Theatre Technician: Shawn Bisson

2017 Outstanding Stage Manager: Hannah Burrows

2017 Outstanding Volunteer: April Hubbard

2017 Theatre Nova Scotia Legacy Award: Deb Allen

2017 Theatre Nova Scotia Scholarship: Kyle Gillis

2017 Mayor's Award for Emerging Theatre Artist: Meghan Hubley

2017 Outstanding Presentation: “Friend” “Like” #Me, by Gavin Crawford (presented by Queer Acts Theatre Festival)

2017 Mayor's Award for Achievement in Theatre: Mary Lou Martin

2016
See references

2016 Outstanding Theatre Technician: Justin Dakai

2016 Outstanding Stage Manager: Jane Creaser

2016 Outstanding Volunteer: Dean Taylor

2016 Theatre Nova Scotia Legacy Award: Bruce Klinger

2016 Theatre Nova Scotia Scholarship: GaRRy Williams and Ivy Charles

2016 Mayor's Award for Emerging Theatre Artist: Colleen MacIsaac

2016 Wes Daniel's Design Award: Rob Greene and Valley Summer Theatre

2016 Mayor's Award for Achievement in Theatre: Elizabeth Murphy

2014
See reference

2014 Legacy Award for Achievement for Outstanding Contribution to Theatre in Nova Scotia: Christopher Shore 

2014 Mayor's Award for Achievement in Theatre: John Dartt

2014 Mayor's Award for Emerging Theatre Artist: Evan Brown

2014 Outstanding Theatre Technician: Matthew Downey 

2014 Outstanding Stage Manager: Sarah O'Brien

2014 Nova Scotia Theatre Volunteer of the Year Award: Kevin Kindred, Austin Reade

2013
See reference

2013 Legacy Award for Achievement for Outstanding Contribution to Theatre in Nova Scotia: Shakespeare by the Sea, Halifax 

2013 Mayor's Award for Achievement in Theatre: Hugo Dann

2013 Mayor's Award for Emerging Theatre Artist: Stephanie MacDonald

2013 Outstanding Theatre Technician: Garrett Barker 

2013 Outstanding Stage Manager: Sarah O'Brien

2013 Nova Scotia Theatre Volunteer of the Year Award: Dick Sircom

2012
See reference

2012 Legacy Award for Achievement for Outstanding Contribution to Theatre in Nova Scotia: Marguerite MacNeil

2012 Mayor's Award for Achievement in Theatre: Bryden MacDonald

2012 Mayor's Award for Emerging Theatre Artist: Lee-Anne Poole

2012 Outstanding Theatre Technician: Ingrid Risk

2012 Outstanding Stage Manager: Heather Lewis

2012 Nova Scotia Theatre Volunteer of the Year Award: Alleen and David Parsons

2011
See reference

2011 Legacy Award for Achievement for Outstanding Contribution to Theatre in Nova Scotia: Wendy Lill

2011 Mayor's Award for Achievement in Theatre:

2011 Mayor's Award for Emerging Theatre Artist:

2011 Outstanding Theatre Technician: Christopher Francis Mitchell

2011 Outstanding Stage Manager: Sarah O'Brien

2011 Nova Scotia Theatre Volunteer of the Year Award: Anne Mackay and Walter Carey

2010
See reference

2010 Legacy Award for Achievement for Outstanding Contribution to Theatre in Nova Scotia: Jean Murporgo

2010 Mayor's Award for Achievement in Theatre: Jeremy Webb

2010 Mayor's Award for Emerging Theatre Artist: Natasha MacLellan

2010 Outstanding Stage Manager or Theatre Technician: Sylvia Bell

2010 Nova Scotia Theatre Volunteer of the Year Award: Perry Kossatz & Aaron Harpell

2009
See reference

2009 Achievement for Outstanding Contribution to Theatre in Nova Scotia: Sara Lee Lewis

2009 Mayor's Award for Achievement in Theatre: Gay Hauser

2009 Mayor's Award for Emerging Theatre Artist: Stewart Legere

2009 Outstanding Stage Manager or Theatre Technician: Eleanor Creelman

2009 Nova Scotia Theatre Volunteer of the Year Award: Brian MacLeod

2008
See reference

2008 Achievement for Outstanding Contribution to Theatre in Nova Scotia: Addy Doucette

2008 Mayor's Award for Achievement in Theatre: Mary-Colin Chisholm

2008 Mayor's Award for Emerging Theatre Artist: Christian Barry

2008 Outstanding Stage Manager or Theatre Technician: Lisa Cochran

2008 Nova Scotia Theatre Volunteer of the Year Award: Gary Bugden

2007

2007 Achievement for Outstanding Contribution to Theatre in Nova Scotia: Jenny Munday

2007 Mayor's Award for Achievement in Theatre: Mary Vingoe

2007 Mayor's Award for Emerging Theatre Artist: Richie Wilcox

2007 Outstanding Stage Manager or Theatre Technician: Louisa Adamson

2007 Nova Scotia Theatre Volunteer of the Year Award: Ian Gilmore

2006

2006 Achievement for Outstanding Contribution to Theatre in Nova Scotia: Joan Orenstein

2006 Emerging Artist Award: Susan Leblanc-Crawford

2006 Mayor's Award for Achievement in Theatre: Michael Melski

2006 Mayor's Award for Emerging Theatre Artist: Ben Stone

2006 Nova Scotia Theatre Company Volunteer Awards: Jennifer Josenhans, Andrea Dymond, Diane Regan, Lawrence Tuttle

2005

2005 Achievement for Outstanding Contribution to Theatre in Nova Scotia: Linda Moore

2005 Emerging Artist Award: Alex MacLean

2005 Mayor's Award for Achievement in Theatre: Linda Moore

2005 Mayor's Award for Emerging Theatre Artist: Anthony Black

2005 Nova Scotia Theatre Company Volunteer Awards: Joanne Porter, Val and Cliff Tyner, Debbie Ross, Michelle Herx, Carmel Rooney

2004

2004 Achievement for Outstanding Contribution to Theatre in Nova Scotia:
Jest in Time Theatre

2004 Mayor's Award for Achievement in Theatre:
Steven Cross

2004 Nova Scotia Theatre Company Volunteer Awards:
Mike Hodgson, Bill and Esther VanGorder, Gordon Tate, Pauline Liengme, Jeremy Webb

2003

2003 Achievement for Outstanding Contribution to Theatre in Nova Scotia:
David Renton

2003 Nova Scotia Theatre Company Volunteer Awards:
Murdock MacDonald, Darlene Spears, John and Lyn Gratwick, John Slor, Ernest Zinck, Kathleen Smith, Doris Salsman, Penny Schofield, Gleneida Canning, Charlie Rhindress, Debbie Ross, Ian Waller, Mary Ritchie, Linda Hodgins, Gord Tate, Lauriena Noel, Dale Sanford

2002

2002 Nova Scotia Theatre Company Volunteer Awards:
Stan Salsman, Penny Dann, Robin Saywood, Iris Elliott, Judy & Austin Reade, Shelley Gullikson, Janet Hodder, Barney Morison, Cathy Macarthur, Sylvelin Oakey, Ernie MacLaughlin, Mary Ritchie, Jane Kansas, Lynn Buckley, Rona MacQuillan, Jim Mills, Catherine Banks, Bruce McCulloch, Susan Wolfraim, Gerald Parker

References

Canadian theatre awards